Mohammad Fadlin (born 28 October 1989) is an Indonesian athlete who specialises in the sprinting events. He represented his country at the 2011 World Championships.

Competition record

Personal bests
Outdoor
100 metres – 10.42 (-1.9 m/s, Jakarta 2011)
200 metres – 21.04 (Rumbai 2012)
Indoor
60 metres – 6.74 (Doha 2016)

References

1989 births
Living people
Indonesian male sprinters
Athletes (track and field) at the 2010 Asian Games
Athletes (track and field) at the 2018 Asian Games
Asian Games medalists in athletics (track and field)
Asian Games silver medalists for Indonesia
Medalists at the 2018 Asian Games
World Athletics Championships athletes for Indonesia
Southeast Asian Games medalists in athletics
Southeast Asian Games gold medalists for Indonesia
Southeast Asian Games bronze medalists for Indonesia
Competitors at the 2009 Southeast Asian Games
Competitors at the 2011 Southeast Asian Games
Competitors at the 2013 Southeast Asian Games
Competitors at the 2015 Southeast Asian Games
Competitors at the 2017 Southeast Asian Games
21st-century Indonesian people